The 1981 Manitoba general election was held on November 17, 1981 to elect Members of the Legislative Assembly of the Province of Manitoba, Canada.  It was won by the opposition New Democratic Party, which took 34 of 57 seats.  The governing Progressive Conservative Party took the remaining 23, while the Manitoba Liberal Party was shut out from the legislature for the only time in its history.  The newly formed Progressive Party failed to win any seats.

Sterling Lyon's Progressive Conservative government ran on a promise to continue investing in the province's "mega-projects" (including as a $500 million Alcan aluminum smelter, a $600 million potash mine and a "Western power grid"), and suggested that an NDP government would jeopardize these plans.  The NDP campaign, which was largely co-ordinated by Wilson Parasiuk, questioned the Lyon government's fiscal accountability in such matters, noting that it had sold 50% of Trout Lake Copper Mine stock, possibly at a major loss.  Jacques Bougie, the Alcan administrator for Manitoba, was also described as holding undue influence over the government.

The NDP campaign generally focused on the economy, and drew attention to the issue of Manitobans emigrating from the province because of job losses.  Progressive Party leader Sidney Green described Lyon's initiatives as "bega-projects", a reference to the government's controversial fundraising with foreign corporations.

The election was considered too close to call until the final week, when the NDP campaign gained momentum.

Results

1 "Before" refers to standings in the Legislature at dissolution, and not to the results of the previous election. These numbers therefore reflect changes in party standings as a result of by-elections and members crossing the floor.

Riding results
Party key:

PC:  Progressive Conservative Party of Manitoba
L:  Manitoba Liberal Party
NDP:  New Democratic Party of Manitoba
P: Progressive Party of Manitoba
Comm:  Communist Party of Canada - Manitoba
Ind:  Independent
M-L: Marxist-Leninist Party of Canada - Manitoba (see by-elections)
WCC: Western Canada Concept Party of Manitoba (see by-elections; leader: Fred Cameron)

Note:  There was one vacant seat at the time of the election.

(incumbent) denotes incumbent.

Arthur:

(incumbent)Jim Downey (PC) 5468
Earl Sterling (NDP) 1772

Assiniboia:

Ric Nordman (PC) 4006
Max Melnyk (NDP) 2822
Peter Moss (L) 817
Fran Huck (P) 378

Brandon East:

(incumbent)Len Evans (NDP) 4941
Gary Nowazek (PC) 2626
Margaret Workman (L) 512

Brandon West:

Henry Carroll (NDP) 5069
John Allen (PC) 4634
David Campbell (L) 547

Burrows:

Conrad Santos (NDP) 4890
Mary Shore (PC) 1384
(incumbent)Ben Hanuschak (P) 728
Wayne Anderson (L) 617
Paula Fletcher (Comm) 144

Charleswood:

(incumbent)Sterling Lyon (PC) 6334
Toni Vosters (NDP) 3243
Ken Brown (L) 969
Demetre Mastoris (P) 231

Churchill:

(incumbent)Jay Cowan (NDP) 2247
Mark Ingebrigtson (PC) 883
Andrew Kirkness (L) 266
Doug MacLachlan (P) 85

Dauphin:

John Plohman (NDP) 4680
(incumbent)James Galbraith (PC) 4044
Bob Hawkins (L) 1049

Ellice:

(incumbent)Brian Corrin (NDP) 4233
Gavin Scott (PC) 1712
Rod Cantiveros (L) 782
Adam Klym (P) 222
Bart Monaco (Ind) 56

Emerson:

(incumbent)Albert Driedger (PC) 4376
Paul Dupuis (NDP) 4020
Stephen Zaretski (L) 308
Jack Thiessen (P) 116

Flin Flon:

Jerry Storie (NDP) 3557
Bob McNeil (PC) 2126

Fort Garry:

(incumbent)Bud Sherman (PC) 6227
Hans Wittich (NDP) 3705
Lil Haus (L) 1042
James Goodridge (P) 203

Fort Rouge:

Roland Penner (NDP) 4342
Perry Schulman (PC) 2843
(incumbent)June Westbury (L) 2415
(incumbent)Bud Boyce (P) 143

Gimli:

John Bucklaschuk (NDP) 4825
(incumbent)Keith Cosens (PC) 3995
Allan Chambers (L) 276
Pat Bazan (P) 127

Gladstone:

Charlotte Oleson (PC) 4447
Irvin Joel (NDP) 1650
Abe Suderman (L) 737

Inkster:

Don Scott (NDP) 6283
Bill Dueck (PC) 1561
(incumbent)Sidney Green (P) 783
Myroslaw Tracz (L) 364

Interlake:

(incumbent)Bill Uruski (NDP) 4599
Neil Dueck (PC) 2181
Bob Lundale (L) 372

Kildonan:

Mary Beth Dolin (NDP) 6794
Ken Galanchuk (PC) 4478
Alex Berkowits (L) 755
Dan Tokarz (P) 300

Kirkfield Park:

Gerrie Hammond (PC) 6443
Lee Monk (NDP) 3551

Lac Du Bonnet:

(incumbent)Sam Uskiw (NDP) 4682
Bert Trainer (PC) 2809

Lakeside:

(incumbent)Harry Enns (PC) 5055
Larry Moldowan (NDP) 2630
Bill Ridgeway (L) 592
Hubert John McCaw (P) 107

La Verendrye:

(incumbent)Robert Banman (PC) 4418
Jim Henry (NDP) 1149
Alphonse Fournier (P) 704

Logan:

Maureen Hemphill (NDP) 3759
Stephen Juba (Ind) 700
Aurele Joseph LeClaire (PC) 659
Art Potvin (P) 103

Minnedosa:

(incumbent)David Robert Blake (PC) 4160
Garry Grant (NDP) 3397

Morris:

Clayton Manness (PC) 4579
Peter Francis (NDP) 1821

Niakwa:

(incumbent)Abe Kovnats (PC) 5432
Lloyd Schreyer (NDP) 4736
Doug Biggs (L) 1345

Osborne:

Muriel Smith (NDP) 5371
Ben Lindsey (PC) 2726
Fraser Dunford (L) 1262
George Buss (P) 165

Pembina:

(incumbent)Donald Orchard (PC) 6361
Jeff Taylor (NDP) 862
Kenneth Popkes (L) 696
John Brooks (P) 274

Portage la Prairie:

(incumbent)Lloyd Hyde (PC) 3620
Audrey Tufford (NDP) 2413
Hugh Moran (L) 1601

Radisson:

Gerard Lecuyer (NDP) 6108
George Provost (PC) 2566
Joel Morasutti (P) 376

Rhineland:

(incumbent)Arnold Brown (PC) 4116
Ralph EisBrenner (NDP) 1181
Jacob Froese (P) 349

Riel:

Doreen Dodick (NDP) 4362
(incumbent)Don Craik (PC) 4120
John Karasevich (L) 1087
Dino Kotis (P) 98

River East:

Phil Eyler (NDP) 5949
Harold Piercy (PC) 5903
Shirley Wolechuk (L) 259
Lindsay Ulrich (P) 177

River Heights:

(incumbent)Warren Steen (PC) 4905
David Sanders (NDP) 3217
Jay Prober (L) 2526
Janet Lundman (P) 142

Roblin-Russell:

(incumbent)Wally McKenzie (PC) 4508
Zen Wonitoway (NDP) 3673

Rossmere:

(incumbent)Vic Schroeder (NDP) 5776
Ian Sutherland (PC) 4293
William De Jong (L) 389
Merv Unger (P) 142

Rupertsland:

Elijah Harper (NDP) 3032
Alan Ross (L) 1004
Nelson Scribe, Sr. (PC) 272
Frances Thompson (P) 56

St. Boniface:

(incumbent)Laurent Desjardins (NDP) 5844
Guy Savoie (L) 1925
Wes Rowson (PC) 1346
Don Forsyth (P) 106

St. James:

Al Mackling (NDP) 5376
(incumbent)George Minaker (PC) 4597
Harvey Nerbas (P) 180

St. Norbert:

(incumbent)Gerry Mercier (PC) 5728
Ruth Pear (NDP) 3826
Grant Temple (L) 857
Allan Yap (P) 216

Ste. Rose:

(incumbent)A.R. Pete Adam (NDP) 4031
Ivan Traill (PC) 3823
Valerie Wilson (P) 194

Selkirk:

(incumbent)Howard Pawley (NDP) 5626
Eugene Kinaschuk (PC) 3020
Max Hofford (P) 131

Seven Oaks:

Eugene Kostyra (NDP) 6127
Al Christie (PC) 2179
Wayne Glowacki (L) 486
Morely Golden (P) 367

Springfield:

Andy Anstett (NDP) 5303
(incumbent)Bob Anderson (PC) 4833
Peter Anderson (L) 327
Dennis Sweatman (P) 113

Sturgeon Creek:

(incumbent)Frank Johnston (PC) 5546
Robert Adams (NDP) 3253
John Epp (L) 732

Swan River:

(incumbent)Doug Gourlay (PC) 3884
Leonard Harapiak (NDP) 3615
George Simpson (P) 138

The Pas:

Harry Harapiak (NDP) 4236
Percy Pielak (PC) 1303
Laverne Jaeb (L) 509

Thompson:

Steve Ashton (NDP) 2890
(incumbent)Ken MacMaster (PC) 2818
Cy Hennessey (L) 138

Transcona:

(incumbent)Wilson Parasiuk (NDP) 6013
Jo Lopuck (PC) 2269
Albert Smaczylo (P) 120

Tuxedo:

(incumbent)Gary Filmon (PC) 6731
Terri Gray (NDP) 2433
Beverly McCaffrey (L) 1257

Virden:

(incumbent)Harry Graham (PC) 5059
Maude Lelong (NDP) 2859

Wolseley:

Myrna Phillips (NDP) 4370
(incumbent)Len Domino (PC) 2904
Doug Lauchlan (L) 1539
Murdoch MacKay (P) 224

Post-election changes
Henry Carroll (NDP) became (Ind), August 19, 1982.
Russell Doern (NDP) became (Ind), March 7, 1984.

Fort Garry (res. Louis Sherman, August 5, 1984), October 2, 1984:

Charles Birt (PC) 3561
Sharon Carstairs (L) 1993
Shirley Lord (NDP) 1211
Sidney Green (P) 1035
Fred Cameron (WCC) 186

Kildonan (dec. Mary Beth Dolin, April 10, 1985), October 1, 1985:

Martin Dolin (NDP) 4332
Bev Rayburn (PC) 3248
Chris Guly (L) 988
Ben Hanuschak (P) 546

Portage la Prairie (dec. Lloyd Hyde, August 25, 1985)

See also
 List of Manitoba political parties

Further reading 
 

1981 elections in Canada
1981
1981 in Manitoba
November 1981 events in Canada